U.S. Route 301 (US 301) in Florida runs from the Sarasota-Bradenton-Venice, Florida Metropolitan Statistical Area northeast to the Greater Jacksonville Metropolitan Area. The road is a spur of U.S. Route 1, which it intersects in Callahan.

US 301 carries the hidden state road designations of State Road 683 from Sarasota to US 41 in Bradenton, SR 55 from Bradenton to Palmetto, SR 43 from US 41 in Palmetto to US 92 east of Tampa, SR 41 from US 92 to Zephyrhills, SR 39 from Zephyrhills to US 98 south of Dade City, State Road 35 from US 98 to Belleview (except SR 533 around downtown Dade City), SR 500 from Belleview to Ocala, SR 200 from Ocala to Callahan and SR 15 from Callahan to the Georgia border, south of Folkston, Georgia.

Concurrencies include U.S. 41 between Bradenton and Palmetto, U.S. 98 between Clinton Heights (near Dade City) and Trilacoochee (formerly known as Moss Town), US 27 between Belleview and Ocala, US 441 between Belleview and Sparr, US 90 in Baldwin, and U.S. 1 and US 23 north of Callahan.

Route description

Sarasota through Hillsborough County

US 301 begins its northward journey at an intersection with U.S. Route 41 along Washington Boulevard in Sarasota. The first state highway it intersects with is SR 780. On the Sarasota-Manatee County line, it also intersects with CR 610, which takes commuters from Ringling College of Art and Design, University of South Florida's Sarasota/Manatee Campus, New College of Florida, and Sarasota-Bradenton International Airport to Interstate 75. The next major intersection is SR 70, and after this, the road curves northwest before it eventually joins US 41(Hidden SR 55) again in southern Bradenton where they briefly overlap each other as they cross the Manatee River.

US 301 makes a sharp right turn onto SR 43 at a diamond interchange, then crosses I-75 in Ellenton at Exit 224. Just north of the intersection of State Road 62, the road passes by the Florida Gulf Coast Railroad Museum and then intersects CR 683 (Moccasin Wallow Road).  After the road crosses the Manatee-Hillsborough County Line, it passes by the Little Manatee River State Park, then intersects State Road 674, and shares a brief overlap with CR 672 between Balm Road and Big Bend Road.

North of the intersection with Gibsonton Drive, and over the Alafia River in Riverview, Route 301 makes another turn to the northwest, where it crosses I-75 again near Brandon at Exit 254. Beyond that, all access to I-75 is available from roads that cross US 301 in one way or another, the nearest of which being the Lee Roy Selmon Expressway. Between I-75 and the Lee Roy Selmon, though US 301 serves as the eastern terminus of SR 676 (Causeway Boulevard), which takes motorists to US BUS 41. The first major intersection north of the Selmon Expressway though is SR 60.

At Six Mile Creek, an overpass takes US 301 over the tracks of CSX's "A-line", one of the railroad company's main lines through Florida (also used by Amtrak's Silver Star passenger trains), and CR 574, which is only accessible from local connecting roads. It then crosses the first bridge over the Tampa Bypass Canal before intersecting SR 574 in East Lake-Orient Park. At the Florida State Fairgrounds, US 301 has a parclo interchange with Interstate 4 and U.S. Route 92 (SR 600). A reconstruction project took place in the early-2000s with provisions for a future ramp from westbound US 92, that are currently being obstructed by the Tampa Bypass Canal and land owned by the Vandenberg Airport. Near the northern end of Vandenberg Airport, US 301 crosses over a flood channel that runs between the Hillsborough River and Tampa Bypass Canal on the southern border of Temple Terrace.

Between Temple Terrace and Thonotosassa, the hidden SR 43 leaves US 301 and joins County Road 580 at Harney Road, and the new hidden road becomes SR 41. Former sections of Harney Road are on hills on the northwest and northeast corners, both of which were designed to go around a former railroad bridge for a line that no longer exists. After crossing under I-75 with no access for the last time, and the Tampa Bypass Canal again shortly afterwards, US 301 encounters the eastern terminus of SR 582 and its hidden County extension, County Road 582.

County Road 43 ends at US 301 in Thonotosassa along Harney Road, and US 301 loses more of its easterly trajection. Here, it serves as the northern terminus of Mango Road, and later Stacy Road, Sargeant Wilderness Memorial Park, and extension of Hillsborough River State Park. After passing by a field used for the Tampa Machinery Auctions, Route 301 officially runs along the eastern end of Hillsborough River State Park, which it will eventually enter. The same former railroad line that was encountered near Harney Road is visible along the east side of US 301 throughout the park and beyond. The last moderate intersection US 301 encounters before finally entering the park is the northern terminus of McIntosh Road. One residential area can be found on a minor side road off to the left, but the rest of the road is surrounded by parkland. US 301 leaves the park almost as instantly as it crosses the Pasco County line.

Pasco County
After US 301 enters Pasco County, a slight curve to the right is a clear indication that 301 is entering Zephyrhills. Here, the road is known as Fort King Highway and Gall Boulevard depending on the location. Across from the fields of Festival Park, US 301 serves as the eastern terminus of SR 56, and the first major intersection in Pasco County. The next intersection is with Chancey Road which eventually becomes County Road 535. SR 39 intersects with US 301 from the southeast. However, instead of terminating at Route 301, it becomes a hidden route north of the intersection and both roads head straight north again. This trajectory is short lived though when some local traffic is rerouted along 7th Street, and both roads intersect South Avenue before moving slightly northwest.

Downtown Zephyrhills is where US 301 serves as what would appear to be the eastern terminus of SR 54, even though Fifth Avenue continues east of SR 54. Originally SR 54 extended east of US 301 along Fifth Avenue and then to 12th Street before turning back east again at Eiland Boulevard. In more recent times however, some maps have indicated that it serves as a third hidden route along US 301. Southbound motorists on US 301 have been encouraged to access SR 54 through 6th Street in recent years. After North Avenue, US 301 curves to the northeast as SR 41 leaves Route 301 to the northwest as County Road 41, along Fort King Road. The rest of 301 is known as Gall Boulevard until it moves deep into Dade City. After the curve to the northeast ends the road intersects County Road 54, a county bypass and extension of SR 54 that leads to US 98 (SR 700) on the Pasco-Polk County line. From there, US 301 runs along a series of steep hills as a four-lane divided highway with median openings that lack left-turn lanes until it reaches US 98 and the US 98-301 overlap begins. Immediately after this, the road intersects SR 52 in Clinton Heights (near Dade City). While some of the median openings are still missing left-turn lanes, and is briefly replaced by a center left-turn lane, the road becomes much more level at this point.

In February 2007, US 98-301 was realigned to the former truck route, which is two lanes wide as of this writing. Efforts to widen the road to four lanes has met stiff opposition from both the public and the city. The former truck route and old US 98-301, which is now SR 39 as well as hidden state routes hidden SRs 35–700, split from each other at an at-grade interchange. A local east–west street takes motorists to southbound County Road 35 Alternate. At the intersection of ALT CR 35 itself, the road moves from northeast back to northwest again, and runs along the CSX S-Line, where it encounters the eastern terminus of CR 52 Alt and the Dade City Atlantic Coast Line Railroad Depot.

US 98 & 301 reunite with the former route, near a former citrus plant. The first intersection after this is eastern County Road 578 and the next one is at the northern border of the former citrus plant that leads to the Pioneer Florida Museum. As with the segment between Zephyrhills and Dade City, the road is a hilly four-lane divided highway with median openings that lack left-turn lanes, but the hills aren't as steep, and the road isn't as straight. After passing by the drive-in movie theater, US 98-301 intersection with Payne Road  which was part of the former County Road 35B, There are some trailer parks, a golf course, and small motels in this segment. A sure sign the segment is about to end, is when it passed by the Owensboro Junction Trailhead, of the Withlacoochee State Trail. This was once a former junction between the Atlantic Coast Line and Seaboard Air Line Railroads, until both were merged into the Seaboard Coast Line and the segments that crossed Routes 98 & 301 were abandoned. US 98 leaves US 301 in Trilacoochee, veering to the northwest and taking hidden State Roads 39 and 700 with it. State Road 35 becomes the sole hidden state route as the road narrows down to two lanes before  approaching State Road 575 and CR 575 in Lacoochee. It remains a two-lane road even after it crosses the border with Hernando County, Florida and over the Withlacoochee River.

Hernando to Marion counties

In Hernando County, US 301 continues its two-lane rural surroundings until it approaches SR 50 in Ridge Manor, which while hardly urban, contains some local businesses, and a large gas station, convenience store and car wash on the northeast corner. North of the Whispering Oaks Country Club, a gated community near SR 50, US 301 passes by random intersections of dirt roads, many of which are part of local deed-restricted communities.

US 301 enters Sumter County by crossing over the Little Withlacoochee River, where it shortly enters the unincorporated community of Croom-a-Coochee, runs parallel to the CSX's S-Line, and intersects with County Road 675. In St. Catherine, 301 intersects with CR 673, which leads to local campgrounds before reaching I-75, and almost instantly CR 478, which leads to Webster and Center Hill.

In Bushnell, US 301 becomes Main Street. The first main intersection there is County Road 476 (Seminole Avenue), a road that runs from northwestern Hernando County to north of Webster. CR 48 shares a hidden concurrency with US 301, that's not so hidden when it turns onto CR 476. Sumter County Road 48 runs north towards West Belt Avenue, taking the DeSoto Trail with it, while US 301 turns east on East Noble Avenue, and crosses CSX's S-Line, where it once shared a brief concurrency with CR 48 until that designation turned south onto Florida Avenue on its way to Lake County. From there, Route 301 shares an even shorter concurrency with County Road 476, until it curves back north.

US 301 passes by the ground of Lake-Sumter Community College's Sumter Campus in Sumterville. Shortly after this, US 301 intersects County Road 470, and both roads share a concurrency. The north end of SR 471 is encountered after this, and then the concurrency with County Road 470 breaks away to head east towards Okahumpka. In Coleman US 301 intersects with an abandoned railroad right-of-way that carried the SAL/Amtrak Silver Meteor until 1988. At this point, the road is briefly named South Commercial Street until it intersects with Warm Springs Avenue (County Road 514) and then heads east along Warm Springs Avenue. The road curves north again at the intersection of County Road 468.

Before US 301 enters Wildwood, signs give advanced warnings of the road's approach to the next to last interchange for Florida's Turnpike. Prior to this interchange, US 301 becomes a four-lane highway, which is sometimes divided. The next major intersection is SR 44, and both lead to I-75. Wildwood has also been referred to as "The Crossroads of Florida" due to this as well as the former Wildwood Amtrak Station, which now serves as a CSX maintenance yard. North of Wildwood, US 301 narrows back down to a two-lane highway with a right-of-ways for future expansion on either sides, although after entering Marion County, it briefly turns into a divided highway at County Road 42 in Dallas, only to return to the two-lane road it was before.  The stretch along the Marion-Sumter county line serves as the unofficial western boundary of The Villages, the large Central Florida retirement community.

North of Summerfield, the road takes a slight curve to the northwest and then becomes a divided four-lane highway before curving back north again. The road remains no less than four lanes wide throughout the rest of Marion County, although just as in Pasco County, the median is missing left-turn lanes at many of the intersections.

Within Belleview, the road curves more to the west and after the intersection with US 27–441 (SR 25–500) is co-signed with these routes for a few blocks. However SR 35 turns right at the current eastern terminus of CR 484, and US 27-301-441's new secret route becomes SR 25–500. After that the road curves more to the north again. Near the right of way for the formerly proposed Cross Florida Barge Canal, the median for the road widens, but narrows back down to normal again. Before it does, however, it intersects CR 328, where a police station exists between the median. Supports for a bridge that was intended to run over the canal exist behind the police station. To the west of this intersection is the Santos Trailhead of the Cross Florida Greenway.

Ocala and points north
Before US 27-301-441 enters Ocala, it veers off to the left at an intersection with County Road Old 441 (Southeast Lake Weir Avenue), a former segment of US 441 that eventually leads to Ocala Union Station. The first major intersection after this is 31st Street. Then it crosses under a railroad bridge before reaching the City Limits and the intersections with the northern terminus of CR 475 and crossing SR 464 (17th Street). US 27-301-441 intersects with SR 200 (becoming the new hidden state road until US 301 reaches US 1-23). The highway reaches the heart of Ocala at the intersection with SR 40 (West Silver Springs Boulevard). After this, the road crosses a railroad bridge west of Ocala Union Station. Five blocks later, US 27 leaves the US 301-441 overlap and takes SR 500 with it as they head northwest towards Williston, Perry, Tallahassee, and points north. Before US 301-441 leaves Ocala, it has an intersection with County Road 200A (Northwest 20th Street), which runs east and then north. This road was the former State Road 200A and decommissioned U.S. Route 301 Alternate.

Another county alternate of a state highway that the road intersects with is CR 25A (Northwest Gainesville Road), which runs northwest through towns such as Zuber, Lowell, and Reddick. East of Zuber, the road intersects SR 326, which originally had a short concurrency, but now directly crosses US 301-441. South of the intersection with CR 329 is an interchange with U.S. Route 441 near Sparr, where the US 301-441 concurrency ends. US 441 moves northwest towards Gainesville, while US 301 moves northeast.

In Citra, US 301 intersects with the north end of CR 200A (Northeast Jacksonville Road), but another short former segment (Northeast 19th Terrace) appears on the opposite side before the road passes by the historic Melton-Shands House and intersects with CR 318. After US 301 crosses the Alachua County Line it runs along a four-lane causeway through marshland before entering Island Grove, where the road intersects with another former section (Southeast 201st Terrace) and CR 325, which leads to Marjorie Kinnan Rawlings Historic State Park. From there, the road makes a slight curve to the right to cross over the railroad line. Both the tracks and the road run along the east coast of Lochloosa Lake in Lochloosa. The interchange with SR 20 in Hawthorne, also includes the side road Southeast 221st Street / Johnson Street, as well as the previously mentioned railroad line in between that side road and US 301. Intersections with CR 1474 in Campville and SR 26 in Orange Heights are at-grade interchanges, and the railroad line breaks away from the road moving straight north. US 301 would head back to the northwest in Shenks, where it would otherwise take drivers straight into Lake Altho and those tracks can be found again, beneath the interchange with SR 24 in Waldo.

Since US 301 is a popular short cut between Northeastern Florida and the Gulf Coast region, a number of towns along the road have been notorious speed traps. The speed limit drops from 65 mph to 30 mph in a matter of a few hundred feet. Many have accused the police in Waldo, Starke, Lawtey, and others of giving tickets simply to raise money. The American Automobile Association has strongly advised motorists to avoid this stretch of the road.

North of Waldo, US 301 crosses Bradford County Line. The first moderate intersection the road encounters is the southern terminus of County Road 221, which northbound traffic can access from a connecting ramp. East of Hampton Lake, it intersects CR 18 between Hampton and Hampton Beach. Upon entering Starke, US 301 gains the name Walnut Street; after it crosses a set of railroad tracks, it crosses over onto Temple Avenue. From there, the road intersects SR 100 (Madison Street), and a block later the unmarked SR 230 (Call Street), where it passes the Old Bradford County Courthouse, and serves as part of the boundary for the Call Street Historic District. The next major intersection in Starke is SR 16 (Brownlee Street).

A Starke Bypass was proposed for construction by the FDOT for the year 2010, and has been completed late summer of 2019 The interchanges that already exist with US 441 near Sparr, SR 20 in Hawthorne, and SR 24 in Waldo could also be used if the state were to upgrade the road as a freeway.

The next town over is Lawtey, which contains intersections with the eastern terminus of County Road 225 and then crosses County Road 125.

Metropolitan Jacksonville to Georgia
US 301 cuts through the northwest corner of Clay County with only one moderate intersection; County Road 218. After this, the road enters Duval County and the city of Jacksonville. As the road enters Maxville, it shares a brief concurrency with SR 228. After passing through Fiftone the road encounters a large railroad yard on the east side before the partial-cloverleaf interchange with I-10, before entering Baldwin.

In September 2020, the Florida Department of Transportation opened the Baldwin Bypass around the western edge of town.

The existing US 301 turns right at an intersection on the southern end of the new bypass, and then crosses railroad tracks that serve the suspended Amtrak Sunset Limited before making a right turn at a concurrency with US 90 for several blocks. Immediately after another railroad crossing, both US 90 and 301 narrow down to two lanes at the east end of this concurrency. US 301 remains a two-lane rural highway until it reaches the northern end of the Baldwin Bypass, and then turns right to continue north. The segment of US 301 between Baldwin and Callahan was originally two lanes, and was widened to 4 lanes in 2014. US 301 then crosses into Nassau County, and passes through the small unincorporated towns of Bryceville, and Crawford. In Crawford, the highway crosses Norfolk Southern tracks via a bridge. US 301 then enters Callahan, where it crosses over a railroad bridge and gets the name West First Avenue. US 301 becomes East First Avenue at Booth Street before the intersection with US 1/23. Here, SR A1A/200 continue running along East First Avenue toward Fernandina Beach, while US 301 becomes part of a three route overlap with US 1-23 between Callahan, and Folkston, Georgia.

History

US 301 first entered Florida in 1949, terminating in Tampa.  It was rerouted along the 'old US 41' route to Palmetto in 1952, bypassing Tampa, and extended in 1953 to its current southern terminus of Sarasota.

From 1956 until 1993, US 301 signs in Florida featured black numbering on a yellow shield. The "color-coding" of U.S. Routes by the Florida Department of Transportation was stopped when the state could no longer use federal funds to replace signs that were not in compliance with the Manual on Uniform Traffic Control Devices (MUTCD) per . Signs replaced after this time period used the MUTCD standard of black numerals on a white shield surrounded by a rectangular black background. Some yellow US 301 signs may still remain.

Around 1985, U.S. 301 was realigned in southern Manatee County between the Sarasota County Line and U.S. 41 to its current alignment along a former Atlantic Coast Line Railroad corridor.  U.S. 301 previously ran to the west along 15th Street and 301 Boulevard.

Major intersections

References

External links

U.S. 301 in Florida @ SouthEastRoads.com

 Florida
01-3
301
301
301
301
301
301
301
301
301
301
301
301